Edward James Dunn (born 19 January 1955) is a former New Zealand rugby union player. A first five-eighth, Dunn represented North Auckland at a provincial level, and was a member of the New Zealand national side, the All Blacks, between 1978 and 1981. He played 20 matches for the All Blacks including two official internationals.

References

1955 births
Living people
People from Te Kōpuru
New Zealand rugby union players
New Zealand international rugby union players
Northland rugby union players
Māori All Blacks players
Rugby union fly-halves
People educated at Dargaville High School
Rugby union players from the Northland Region